Historians writing about the origins of World War I have differed over the relative emphasis they place upon the factors involved. Changes in historical arguments over time are in part related to the delayed availability of classified historical archives. The deepest distinction among historians remains between those who focus on the actions of Germany and Austria-Hungary as key and those who focus on a wider group of actors. Meanwhile some historians, such as Fischer, maintain that Germany deliberately sought war while others do not. The main distinction among the latter is between those who believe that a war between the "Great Powers" was ultimately unplanned but still caused principally by Germany and Austria-Hungary taking risks, and those who believe that either all or some of the other powers, namely Russia, France, Serbia and Great Britain, played a more significant role in risking war than had been traditionally suggested.

Given the catastrophic consequences of the war, and its far-reaching social, political and economic implications, the origins of the war, and in particular who "caused" the war, remain heated questions.

1914–the Color books 

As soon as the war began, the major nations issued "color books" containing documents (mostly from July 1914) that helped justify their actions. A color book is a collection of diplomatic correspondence and other official documents published by a government for educational or political reasons, and to promote the government position on current or past events. In wartime or times of crisis, they have especially been used as a propaganda vehicle, to justify governmental action, or to assign blame to foreign actors.  The choice of what documents to include, how to present them, and even what order to list them, can make them tantamount to government-issued propaganda.

In the early 17th century, blue books first came into use in England as a means of publishing diplomatic correspondence and reports. They were so named, because of their blue cover. During the time of the Napoleonic Wars in the early 19th century, they were being published regularly. By the second half of the century, Turkey began publishing its own version in red, and the concept of color books spread to other countries in Europe, with each country using one color: Germany using white; France: yellow; red: Austria-Hungary (Spain also used red later, as did the Soviet Union); green: Italy; gray: Belgium; orange: Netherlands (and Tsarist Russia). This concept spread to the Americas as well, with the United States using red, Mexico: orange, and various countries in Central and South America using other colors; it even spread as far as China (yellow) and Japan (gray).

The German White Book appeared on 4 August 1914, and was the first such book to come out. It contains 36 documents. Within a week, most other combatant countries had published their own book, each named with a different color name.  France held off until 1 December 1914, when they finally published their Yellow Book.
Other combatants in the war published similar books: the Blue Book of Britain, the Orange Book of Russia, the Yellow Book of France, and the Austro-Hungarian Red Book, the Belgian Grey Book, and the Serbian Blue Book.

The French Yellow Book, completed after three months of work, contained 164 documents. These works of propaganda aimed to convince public opinion of the validity of their rights. Unlike the others which were limited to the weeks before the start of the war, the  Yellow Book included some documents from 1913, putting Germany in a bad light by shedding light on their mobilization for a European war.
Some of the documents in the Yellow Book were challenged by Germany as not genuine, but their objections were mostly ignored, and the Yellow Book was widely cited as a resource in the July crisis of 1914.  

It turned out after the war was over, that the Yellow Book wasn't complete, or entirely accurate. Historians who gained access to previously unpublished French material were able to use it in their report to the Senate entitled "Origins and responsibilities for the Great War" as did ex-President Raymond Poincaré. The conclusion set forth in the report of the 1919 French Peace Commission is illustrative of the two-pronged goals of blaming their opponents while justifying their own actions, as laid out in two sentences:
 

Later, publication of complete archives from the period of the July crisis by Germany, Britain, and Austria, as well as some from Soviet archives, revealed some truths that the Yellow Book conveniently left out. In particular, was Yellow Book document #118, which showed a Russian mobilization in response to Austrian mobilization the day before on 30 July, but in fact, the order of mobilization was reversed; Russian mobilized first.  After a contorted explanation by Quai d'Orsay, confidence in the Yellow Book was ruined, and historians avoided using it.

He concluded,

In the German White Book, anything that could benefit the Russian position was redacted.

1918–1930s

Straight after the war Allied historians argued that Germany was solely responsible for the start of the war: a view reinforced by the inclusion of 'war guilt' clauses within the Treaty of Versailles.

In 1919, the German diplomat and former Chancellor Bernhard von Bülow went through the German archives to suppress any documents that might show that Germany was responsible for the war and to ensure that only documents that were exculpatory (favorable to the defendant, in this case, Germany) might be seen by historians. As a result of Bülow's efforts, between 1923–27 the German Foreign Ministry published forty volumes of documents, which as the German-Canadian historian Holger Herwig noted were carefully edited to promote the idea that the war was not the fault of one nation but were rather the result of the breakdown of international relations. Certain documents such as some of the papers of the Chancellor Theobald von Bethmann Hollweg which did not support this interpretation were destroyed. Hermann Kantorowicz, one of the few German historians who argued in the 1920s that Germany was responsible for the war, found that the Foreign Ministry went out of its way to stop his work from being published and tried to have him fired from his post at Kiel University. After 1933, Kantorowicz who as a Jewish German would have been banned from publishing, was forced to leave Germany for his "unpatriotic" writings. With the exceptions of the work of scholars such as Kantorowicz, Herwig has concluded that the majority of the work published on the subject of World War I's origins in Germany prior to Fritz Fischer's book Griff nach der Weltmacht was little more than a pseudo-historical "sham".

Academic work in the English-speaking world in the later 1920s and 1930s, blamed the participants more or less equally. In the early 1920s, several American historians opposed to the terms of the Treaty of Versailles such as Sidney Bradshaw Fay, Charles A. Beard and Harry Elmer Barnes produced works that claimed that Germany was not responsible for war. Article 231 of the Treaty of Versailles, which had seemingly assigned all responsibility for the war to Germany and thus justified the Allied claim to reparations, was invalid. A feature of American "revisionist" historians of the 1920s was a tendency to treat Germany as a victim of the war and the Allies as the aggressors. The objective of Fay and Barnes was to put an end to reparations imposed on Germany, by attempting to prove what they regarded as the moral invalidity of Article 231. The exiled Wilhelm praised Barnes upon meeting him in 1926. According to Barnes, Wilhelm "was happy to know that I did not blame him for starting the war in 1914. He disagreed with my view that Russia and France were chiefly responsible. He held that the villains of 1914 were the international Jews and Free Masons who, he alleged, desired to destroy national states and the Christian religion."

The German Foreign Ministry lavished special "care" upon the efforts of both Fay and Barnes with generous use of the German archives, and in the case of Barnes, research funds provided by the German government. The German government liked Fay's The Origin of the War so much that it purchased hundreds of copies in various languages to hand out for free at German embassies and consulates. The German government allowed books that were pro-German in their interpretation, such as Barnes's The Genesis of the World War, to be translated into German while books such as Bernadotte Schmitt's The Coming of War 1914 that were critical of German actions in 1914, were not permitted to be published in Germany.

Chapter 10 of Wilhelm II's Memoirs is entitled "The Outbreak of War". In it the Kaiser lists twelve "proofs" from the more extensive "Comparative Historical Tables" that he had compiled, which demonstrate the preparations for war by the Entente Powers made in the spring and summer of 1914. In particular he alleged:

(5) According to the memoirs of the French Ambassador at St. Petersburg, M. Paléologue, published in 1921 in the Revue des Deux Mondes, the Grand Duchesses Anastasia and Militza told him, on July 22, 1914, at Tsarskoe Selo, that their father, the King of Montenegro, had informed them in a cipher telegram, "we shall have war before the end of the month [that is, before the 13th of August, Russian style] ... nothing will be left of Austria. ... You will take Alsace-Lorraine. ... Our armies will meet at Berlin. ... Germany will be annihilated."

In a different approach, Lenin in his pamphlet Imperialism: the Highest Stage of Capitalism portrayed the war as imperialist, caused by rivalries triggered by highly organised financial monopolies, that by frenzied competition for markets and raw materials, had inevitably brought about the war. Evidence of secret deals between the Tsar and British and French governments to split the spoils of war was released by the Soviets in 1917–18. In the 1920s and 1930s, more socialist works built on this theme, a line of analysis which is still to be found, although vigorously disputed on the grounds that wars occurred before the capitalist era. Lenin argued that the private ownership of the means of production, in the hands of a limited number of capitalist monopolies, would inevitably lead to war. He identified railways as a 'summation' of the basic capitalist industries, coal, iron and steel and that their uneven development summed up capitalist development.

The National Socialist approach to the question of the war's origins were summed up in a pamphlet entitled Deutschkunde uber Volk, Staat, Leibesubungen. In 1935, the British ambassador to Germany, Sir Eric Phipps, summed up the contents of Deutschkunde uber Volk, Staat, Leibesubungen which described the origins of the war thus:

"Not Germany, but England, France and Russia prepared for war soon after the death of Bismarck. But Germany has also guilt to bear. She could have prevented the world war on three fronts, if she had not waited so long. The opportunity presented itself often—against England in the Boer War, against Russia when she was engaged against Japan... That she did not do so is Germany's guilt, though a proof that she was peaceful and wanted no war."

In the inter-war period, various factors such as the network of secret alliances, emphasis on speed of offence, rigid military planning, Darwinian ideas and a lack of resolution mechanisms were blamed by many historians. These ideas have maintained some currency since then. Famous proponents include Joachim Remak and Paul Kennedy. At the same time, many one-sided works were produced by politicians and other participants, often trying to exculpate themselves. In Germany these tended to deflect blame, while in Allied countries they tended to blame Germany or Austria-Hungary.

The Fischer thesis

In 1961, the German historian Fritz Fischer published the controversial Griff nach der Weltmacht, in which Fischer argued that the German government had an expansionist foreign policy, formulated in the aftermath of Social Democratic gains in the election of 1912 and had started a war of aggression in 1914. Fischer was the first historian to have full access to the entire remaining German World War I archives. Previous historians had only been able to access heavily edited archives that had been created in order to support the view that war was the inevitable product of the breakdown of international diplomacy, rather than the end result of German expansionist ambitions.

He was the first to draw attention to the War Council held by the Kaiser Wilhelm II and the top military-naval leadership of the Reich on December 8, 1912, in which it was declared that Germany would start a war of aggression in the summer of 1914. The Kaiser and the Army leadership wanted to start a war at once in December 1912, but heeded objections from Grand Admiral Alfred von Tirpitz, who supported the idea of starting a war but argued that the German Navy needed more time to prepare and asked that the war be put off until the summer of 1914. The Kaiser agreed to Tirpitz's request. In 1973, the British historian John Röhl noted that in view of what Fischer had uncovered, especially the War Council meeting of December 8, 1912, that the idea that Germany bore the main responsibility for the war was no longer denied by the vast majority of historians, although Fischer later denied claiming that the war was decided upon at that meeting. Annika Mombauer in contrast to Röhl observed in her work on Helmuth von Moltke that despite a great deal of research and debate "there is no direct evidence to prove that military decision-makers understood December 1912 as a decisive moment at which a future war had been agreed upon".

Fischer's discovery of Imperial German government documents prepared after the war began, calling for the ethnic cleansing of Russian Poland and German colonization to provide Germany with Lebensraum (living space) as a war aim, has also led to the widespread acceptance by historians of continuity between the foreign policies of Germany in 1914 and 1939.

Fischer alleged the German government hoped to use external expansion and aggression to check internal dissent and democratization. Some of his work is based on Theobald von Bethmann Hollweg's Septemberprogramm which laid out Germany's war aims. Controversially, Fischer asserted a version of the Sonderweg thesis that drew a connection between aggression in 1914 and 1939. Fischer was later to call Bethmann Hollweg the "Hitler of 1914". Fischer prompted the Primat der Innenpolitik ("primacy of domestic politics") school, emphasizing domestic German political factors. Some prominent scholars in this school include Imanuel Geiss, Hans-Ulrich Wehler, Wolfgang Mommsen and Volker Berghahn.

In a major 2011 conference entitled "the Fischer Controversy 50 Years On", a group of historians and academics debated the legacy of Fischer's work. The conclusion was that "...a consensus emerged that Fischer had got it right in attributing 'a significant part of the historical responsibility for the outbreak of a general war' to Germany and that Fischer's thesis of the continuity of German war aims still stands fifty years later." Yet by August 2014, many new books had appeared which by their divergent views collectively continue the controversy.

Opposition to the Fischer thesis
The "Berlin War Party" thesis and variants of it, blaming domestic German political factors, became something of an orthodoxy in the years after publication. Nonetheless many authors have attacked it. German conservative historians such as Gerhard Ritter asserted that the thesis was dishonest and inaccurate.

Ritter promoted the idea that Germany displayed the same traits as other countries and could not be singled out. In a 1962 essay, Ritter contended that Germany's principal goal in 1914 was to maintain Austria-Hungary as a great power, and thus German foreign policy was largely defensive as opposed to Fischer's claim that it was mostly aggressive. Ritter claimed that Fischer attached unwarranted significance to the highly bellicose advice about waging a "preventive war" in the Balkans offered in July 1914 to the Chief of Cabinet of the Austro-Hungarian foreign ministry, Count Alexander Hoyos, by the German journalist Viktor Naumann. Ritter charged that Naumann was speaking as a private individual and not as Fischer claimed on behalf of the German government. Ritter felt that Fischer had been dishonest in his portrayal of Austro-German relations in July 1914. Ritter charged that it was not true that Germany had pressured a reluctant Austria-Hungary into attacking Serbia. Ritter argued that the main impetus for war within Austria-Hungary was internal, and though there were divisions of opinion about the course to pursue in Vienna and Budapest, it was not German pressure that led to war being chosen. In Ritter's opinion, the most Germany can be criticized for in July 1914 was a mistaken evaluation of the state of European power politics. Ritter claimed that the German government had underrated the state of military readiness in Russia and France, falsely assumed that British foreign policy was more pacific than what it really was, overrated the sense of moral outrage caused by the assassination of Archduke Franz Ferdinand on European opinion, and above all, overestimated the military power and political common sense of Austria-Hungary. Ritter felt that in retrospect it was not necessary from the German point of view to maintain Austria-Hungary as a great power but claimed that at the time most Germans regarded the Dual Monarchy as a "brother empire" and viewed the prospect of the Balkans being in the Russian sphere of influence as an unacceptable threat. Ritter argued that though the Germans supported the idea of an Austrian-Hungarian invasion of Serbia, this was more of an ad hoc response to the crisis gripping Europe as opposed to Fischer's claim that Germany was deliberately setting off a war of aggression. Ritter complained that Fischer relied too much on the memories of Austro-Hungarian leaders such as the Count István Tisza and Count Ottokar Czernin who sought to shift all of the responsibility for the war on German shoulders. Ritter ended his essay by writing he felt profound "sadness" over the prospect that the next generation of Germans would not be as nationalistically-minded as previous generations as a result of reading Fischer.

Fischer argued that in private, Ritter admitted that some evidence supported Fischer on some points. In a letter to Hans Rothfels on March 26, 1962, before publishing an article attacking Fischer, Ritter wrote: "I am alarmed and dismayed by your letter of 21 March. If Bethmann, as you write, in July 1914 had the 'desire' [Wunsch] to bring about war with Russia, then either he played without conscience with the fate of the German people, or he had simply incredible illusions about our military capablilities. In any case, Fischer would then be completely in the right when he denies that Bethmann seriously wanted to avoid war...If what in your view, Riezler's diary reveals is correct, I would have to discard my article, instead of publishing it...In any case we are dealing here with a most ominous [unheimlichen] state secret, and all historical perspectives are displaced [verschieben sich], since...Bethmann Hollweg's September Program then appears in a wholly different light".

Trachtenberg concluded in 1991:
It is certainly not true, however, that the views of the Fischer school have come to be almost universally shared, either inside Germany or out. The older interpretations of people like Pierre Renouvin, Bernadotte Schmitt, and Luigi Albertini--which, while quite critical of Germany, never went so far as to claim that the German government deliberately set out to provoke a general war--are still very widely accepted.

Later works
In the 1960s two theories emerged to explain the causes of World War I. One championed by the West German historian Andreas Hillgruber argued that in 1914, a "calculated risk" on the part of Berlin had gone awry. Hillgruber argued that what the Imperial German government had attempted to do in 1914 was to break the informal Triple Entente of Russia, France and Britain by encouraging Austria-Hungary to invade Serbia and thus provoke a crisis in an area that would concern only St. Petersburg. Hillgruber argued that the Germans hoped that both Paris and London would decide the crisis in the Balkans did not concern them and that lack of Anglo-French support would lead the Russians to reach an understanding with Germany. Hillgruber argued that when the Austrian attack on Serbia caused Russia to mobilize instead of backing down, the German Chancellor Theobald von Bethmann Hollweg under strong pressure from a hawkish General Staff led by General Moltke the Younger panicked and ordered the Schlieffen Plan to be activated, thus leading to a German attack on France. In Hillgruber’s opinion the German government had pursued a high-risk diplomatic strategy of provoking a war in the Balkans that had inadvertently caused a world war.

Another theory was A. J. P. Taylor's "Railway Thesis" in his 1969 book War by Timetable. In Taylor's opinion, none of the great powers wanted a war but all of the great powers wished to increase their power relative to the others. Taylor argued that by engaging in an arms race and having the general staffs develop elaborate railway timetables for mobilization, the continental powers hoped to develop a deterrent that would lead to other powers seeing the risk of war as too dangerous. When the crisis began in the summer of 1914, the need to mobilize faster than potential opponents made the leaders of 1914 prisoners of their logistics. The railway timetables forced invasion (of Belgium from Germany) as an unavoidable physical and logistical consequence of German mobilization. Taylor argued that the mobilization that was meant to serve as a threat and deterrent to war instead relentlessly caused a world war by forcing invasion.

Other authors, such as the American Marxist historian Arno J. Mayer in 1967, agreed with some aspects of the "Berlin War Party" theory but felt that what Fischer said applied to all European states. In a 1967 essay "The Primacy of Domestic Politics", Mayer made a Primat der Innenpolitik ("primacy of domestic politics") argument for the war's origins. Mayer rejected the traditional Primat der Außenpolitik ("primacy of foreign politics") argument of diplomatic history, because it failed to take into account that all of the major European countries were in a "revolutionary situation" in 1914. In Mayer's opinion, in 1914 Britain was on the verge of civil war and massive industrial unrest, Italy had been rocked by the Red Week of June 1914, France and Germany were faced with ever-increasing political strife, Russia was facing a huge strike wave, and Austria-Hungary was confronted with rising ethnic and class tensions. Mayer insists that liberalism was disintegrating in face of the challenge from the extreme right and left in Britain, France and Italy, while being a non-existent force in Germany, Austria-Hungary and Russia. Mayer ended his essay by arguing that World War I should be best understood as a pre-emptive "counterrevolutionary" strike by ruling elites in Europe to preserve their power.

In a 1972 essay "World War I As a Galloping Gertie", the American historian Paul W. Schroeder blamed Britain for the First World War. Schroeder argued that the war was a "Galloping Gertie", that it got out of control, sucking the Great Powers into an unwanted war. Schroeder thought that the key to the European situation was what he claimed was Britain's "encirclement" policy directed at Austria-Hungary. Schroeder argued that British foreign policy was anti-German and even more anti-Austrian. Schroeder argued that because Britain never took Austria-Hungary seriously, it was British policy to always force concessions on the Dual Monarchy with no regard to the balance of power in Central Europe. Schroeder claimed that 1914 was a "preventive war" forced on Germany to maintain Austria as a power, which was faced with a crippling British "encirclement policy" aimed at the break-up of that state.

The American historian Samuel R. Williamson, Jr., lays most of the blame with the Austro-Hungarian elites rather than the Germans in his 1990 book, Austria-Hungary and the Origins of the First World War. Another recent work is Niall Ferguson's The Pity of War which rejects the Fischer thesis, laying most of the blame on diplomatic bumbling from the British. Ferguson echoes Hillgruber in asserting that the German government attempted to use the crisis to split the Entente.

Post 2000

According to Annika Mombauer in 2015, a new consensus among scholars had emerged by the 1980s, mainly as a result of Fischer’s intervention:
Few historians agreed wholly with his [Fischer's] thesis of a premeditated war to achieve aggressive foreign policy aims, but it was generally accepted that Germany’s share of responsibility was larger than that of the other great powers.
Regarding historians inside Germany, she adds that by the 1990s, "There was 'a far-reaching consensus about the special responsibility of the German Reich' in the writings of leading historians, though they differed in how they weighted Germany’s role.

American historian David Fromkin has blamed elements in the military leadership of Germany and Austria-Hungary in his 2004 book Europe's Last Summer. Fromkin's thesis is that there were two war plans; a first formulated by Austria-Hungary and the German Chancellor to start a war with Serbia to reinvigorate a fading Austro-Hungarian Empire; the second secret plan was that of the German military leadership to provoke a wider war with France and Russia. He thought that the German military leadership, in the midst of a European arms race, believed that they would be unable to further expand the German army without extending the officer corps beyond the traditional Prussian aristocracy. Rather than allowing that to happen, they manipulated Austria-Hungary into starting a war with Serbia in the expectation that Russia would intervene, giving Germany a pretext to launch what was in essence a preventive war. Part of his thesis is that the German military leadership were convinced that by 1916–18, Germany would be too weak to win a war with France, England and Russia. Notably, Fromkin suggests that part of the war plan was the exclusion of Kaiser Wilhelm II from knowledge of the events, because the Kaiser was regarded by the German General Staff as inclined to resolve crises short of war. Fromkin also argues that in all countries but particularly Germany and Austria documents were widely destroyed or forged to distort the origins of the war.

Christopher Clark's 2013 book The Sleepwalkers: How Europe Went to War in 1914 refocused the origins back to the Balkans and sought to redistribute agency back to the diplomats.  He also sought to distribute responsibility to all of the Great Powers, paying particular attention to Germany, Austria-Hungary, France and Russia.  Clark argues that the Germanic powers sought a localised war to punish Serbia, but in doing so knowingly risked war with Russia.  For its part Russia accepted the risk of war by upsetting the balance of power in the Balkans in 1912-13, encouraging anti-Austrian irredentism, and deciding to support Serbia come what may. France did not restrain Russia, positively encouraging her to face down the Germans and support Serbia in 1914.  Clark concludes that while all the continental powers risked a general war, none sought that war.

Clark notes the speed of the crisis rendered diplomacy futile: "German efforts at mediation – which suggested that Austria should “Halt in Belgrade” and use the occupation of the Serbian capital to ensure its terms were met – were rendered futile by the speed of Russian preparations, which threatened to force the Germans to take counter–measures before mediation could begin to take effect".

Furthermore, while Clark does not seek to place responsibility on Russia alone, he places more emphasis on Russian actions than many previous historians, stating: "Yes, the Germans declared war on Russia before the Russians declared war on Germany. But by the time that happened, the Russian government had been moving troops and equipment to the German front for a week. The Russians were the first great power to issue an order of general mobilisation and the first Russo-German clash took place on German, not on Russian soil, following the Russian invasion of East Prussia. That doesn’t mean that the Russians should be ‘blamed’ for the outbreak of war. Rather it alerts us to the complexity of the events that brought war about and the limitations of any thesis that focuses on the culpability of one actor."

The book challenges the imputation, hitherto widely accepted by mainstream scholars since 1919, of a peculiar "war guilt" attaching to the German Empire, instead mapping carefully the complex mechanism of events and misjudgements that led to war.   There was, in 1914, nothing inevitable about it.  Risks inherent in the strategies pursued by the various governments involved had been taken before without catastrophic consequences: this now enabled leaders to follow similar approaches while not adequately evaluating or recognising those risks.   Among international experts many saw this presentation by Clark of his research and insights as groundbreaking.

In Germany itself, where the book received much critical attention, reactions were not all positive. Volker Ullrich contended that Clark's analysis largely disregards the pressure for war coming from Germany's powerful military establishment.   According to Hans-Ulrich Wehler, Clark had diligently researched the sources covering the war's causes from the German side only to "eliminate [many of them] with bewildering one-sidedness" ("verblüffend einseitig eliminiert").   Warming to his theme, Wehler attributed the sales success of the book in Germany to a "deep seated need [on the part of German readers], no longer so constrained by the taboos characteristic of the later twentieth century, to free themselves from the burdensome allegations of national war guilt"

Vernon Bogdanor has criticized Clark for downplaying the German and Austrian refusal of offers of mediation.  Over the course of the July Crisis Sir Edward Grey, British Foreign Secretary, offered a four-power conference of the Great Powers to help mediate the conflict.  Clark dismisses Grey’s attempts as “half-hearted” and founded on a “partisan indifference to the power-political realities of Austro-Hungary’s situation”.

Russia accepted the four power conference proposal but Austria-Hungary rejected the proposal.    Germany also rejected the proposal on the grounds that they believed only Germany would support their ally. Bogdanor believes the Germans were mistaken. “That’s mistaken.  I think Grey would have taken the Austrian side and would have said concessions were needed by Serbia to keep the peace…and it would have been very difficult for the Russians not to go along with that." The Russians further proposed that the conflict be subject to the court of arbitration in the Hague but this too was rejected by Germany and Austria-Hungary. To Bogdanor the rejection of the options of the four power conference and the court of arbitration weigh heavily against Germany and Austria-Hungary when looking for the causes of the war.

Sean McMeekin, in his books The Russian Origins of the First World War and July 1914, also places more emphasis on Russian actions and in particular Russian Foreign Minister Sergey Sazonov’s bellicosity and duplicity. McMeekin argues that Russia’s Balkan policy, and crucial support for Serbia, only make sense in the context of her wider strategic desire to control or capture Constantinople and the Straits from the ailing Ottomans. This is similar to the Russian's plan during the Bosnian Crisis of 1908 in which they had also wanted to gain the Straits around the area. Furthermore, Russia's foreign policy of gaining these Straits were the same during the Balkan Wars. He further argues that during the July crisis Sazanov must have known that Russia’s partial mobilisation would inevitably lead to general mobilisation and likely war.  Moreover he highlights that Sazanov deliberately lied to the British about Russia’s mobilisation, rendering the British unable to restrain their entente partner through ignorance of the advanced state of their military preparations.

Margaret MacMillan, in her book, The War That Ended Peace, puts the blame for the start of the First World War on the decision making of a small group of people, primarily blaming the leaders of Russia, Germany and Austria-Hungary. The Russians did not want to back down after mobilizing, due to the fast mobilization that they had ordered. German leaders were also to blame due to their issuance of the Blank Cheque to Austria-Hungary during the July Crisis, which pushed Austria-Hungary into going to war with Serbia. Finally, the leaders of Austria-Hungary were culpable for planning to invade Serbia after the Assassination of Archduke Franz Ferdinand.

Historian William Mulligan, in his book, The Origins of the First World War, believes that the First World War had started due to the fall of international relations which had then led to various empires around the continent feeling threatened which had then led to poor decision making. European powers had weakened due to crisis such as the Bosnian Crisis and the two crises in Morocco which happened as a result of the weakening power in the Ottoman Empire in the area. Mulligan believes that an arms race was facilitated due to the powers becoming weaker and this arms race led to even more fear and instability. All this fear and instability then exploded in the July Crisis and poor decisions were made because European powers believed that the power of their countries were at stake.

Alexander Anievas also puts the blame of the start of the First World War on the decline of relations between the European powers in the article "1914 In World Historical Perspective: The Uneven and Combined Origins of World War I". Anievas believes that countries in Europe such as Germany and Russia had tried to bolster their empires due to the collapse of influence from the Ottoman Empire in the Balkans region of Europe. In this attempt, major crisis's such as the Bosnian and Morocco crisis's broke out These crisis brought forth another of problems on the European stage. For example, due to the Bosnian Crisis, Russia had now suffered a major embarrassment on the world stage which led to the downfall of their relationship with Austria-Hungary and which also led to the aggressive behavior that Russia was showing during the July Crisis in which they ordered an early mobilization. Furthermore, with the nation of Germany, the crisis that had occurred in Morocco led to the fall of relations between Germany and other major European countries. The Germans felt threatened by other European countries they had now began to build up their weapons which in turn had led to Russia building up weapons too which led to nations fearing a war from breaking out.

Political scientists  Richard N. Lebow and Thomas Lindemann argue that the First World War broke out partly due to ideas about Social Darwinism. They say that the aggression that was shown by Austria-Hungary and Germany to Serbia shortly before the war happened was due to Social Darwinist ideas. This is due to the Serbians being Slavic and therefore the Austrians felt that they are inferior to Austrian-Hungarians and Germans and therefore the belief came that these nations were justified to conquer Serbian territory in order to build up their empires.

See also
 Causes of World War I
 Diplomatic history of World War I
 American entry into World War I
 Austro-Hungarian entry into World War I
 British entry into World War I
 French entry into World War I
 German entry into World War I
 Italian entry into World War I
 Japanese entry into World War I
 Ottoman entry into World War I
 Russian entry into World War I
 History of the Balkans
 International relations (1814–1919)
 Paris Peace Conference, 1919
 War guilt question
 Causes of World War II

Notes

References

Bibliography

 Bresciani, Marco. "From 'East to West', the 'world crisis' of 1905-1920: a re-reading of Elie Halévy." First World War Studies 9.3 (2018): 275-295.
 
 
 Evans, R. J. W. "The Greatest Catastrophe the World Has Seen"   The New York Review of Books Feb 6, 2014   online
 
 
 Horne, John, ed. A Companion to World War I (2012) 38 topics essays by scholars; emphasis on historiography.
 
 
 
  
 
 Lebow, Richard Ned. "Lessons of World War I." in Lebow, ed.,  Avoiding War, Making Peace (Palgrave Macmillan, Cham, 2018). pp 95–127.
 Levy, Jack S., and John A. Vasquez, eds. The Outbreak of the First World War: Structure, Politics, and Decision-Making (Cambridge UP,  2014).
 Lieber, Keir A. "The new history of World War I and what it means for international relations theory." International Security 32.2 (2007): 155-191. online
 
 Martel, Gordon. Origins of the First World War (Taylor & Francis, 2016).
 
 Mombauer, Annika. "Guilt or Responsibility? The Hundred-Year Debate on the Origins of World War I." Central European History 48#4 (2015): 541-564.
 Mombauer, Annika. "The German centenary of the First World War." War & Society 36.4 (2017): 276-288.
 

 Mulligan, William: The Historiography of the Origins of the First World War , in: 1914-1918-online. International Encyclopedia of the First World War.
 
 
 
 Röhl, John C. G. "Goodbye to all that (again)? The Fischer thesis, the new revisionism and the meaning of the First World War." International Affairs 91.1 (2015): 153-166.  online
 
 
 
 
 Sked, Alan. "Austria-Hungary and the First World War." Histoire Politique 1 (2014): 16-49. online free
 
 
 Trachtenberg, Marc. "The Meaning of Mobilization in 1914" International Security 15#3 (1991) pp. 120–150 online
 Vasquez, John A. "The First World War and International Relations Theory: A Review of Books on the 100th Anniversary." International Studies Review 16#4 (2014): 623-644.
 
 Williamson Jr, Samuel R., and Ernest R. May. "An identity of opinion: Historians and July 1914." Journal of Modern History 79.2 (2007): 335-387. online

Primary sources
 Barker. Ernest, et al. eds. Why we are at war; Great Britain's case (3rd ed. 1914), the official British case against Germany.  online

Causes of World War I
Historiography of World War I